Jose Mata (born Jose Mata; in Honolulu, HI) is a North American dance music DJ and record producer who has worked internationally since 2004. Mata has performed alongside some of the largest names in electronic dance music at festivals and nightclubs from all over the world.  He has been featured on Sirius Satellite Radio's Area 38 on the Ultra Music Festival Radio Show as well as The Vanishing Point. He was also featured on Proton Radio's Perspectives in 2009. Has performed at Ultra Music Festival on the same bill as Tiesto, David Guetta, Deadmau5, John Digweed, Paul Oakenfold, Paul Van Dyke and Ferry Corsten. He collaborated with Noel Sanger in 2008 for his first record release "Tease My Heart - Zoltan Kontes (Noel Sanger & Jose Mata dub)" on Groove Syndicate Records a sub-label for Release Records. However, Groove Syndicate was discontinued for unknown reasons and the record was re-released in 2010 thru Dissident Music on Beatport as well as other outlets. Since performing with Paul Oakenfold on his International Perfecto Tour in 2010, Oakenfold has featured tracks from Mata on his Perfecto Podcast and Planet Perfecto Radio Show.

References

External links 
Official Website
Resident Advisor Profile
Artist site at Proton Radio

Living people
1979 births
Musicians from Honolulu
American DJs